Azaire Adolphe Aubin (August 6, 1850 – March 27, 1932) was an Ontario political figure. He represented Nipissing West and then Sturgeon Falls in the Legislative Assembly of Ontario as a Conservative member from 1905 to 1911.

He was born in Saint-Anicet, Huntingdon County, Canada East, the son of J. Aubin and educated in Montreal. In 1886, he married Louise Dumouchel. He died in 1932. He is buried at the Old St Mary's Roman Catholic Cemetery at Sturgeon Falls.

His son Albert Zénophile later served in the provincial assembly.

References

Canadian Parliamentary Guide, 1905, AJ Magurn

External links
 

1850 births
1932 deaths
Franco-Ontarian people
Progressive Conservative Party of Ontario MPPs
People from West Nipissing